Whitley railway station was a temporary station on the former Colne Valley and Halstead Railway,  to the east of the village of Birdbrook, Essex. It opened in 1862 and closed in October 1863 when it was replaced by Birdbrook station.

References

External links
 

Disused railway stations in Essex
Former Colne Valley and Halstead Railway stations
Railway stations in Great Britain opened in 1862
Railway stations in Great Britain closed in 1863
1862 establishments in England